WXST (99.7 FM, "Star 99.7") is an urban adult contemporary radio station located in Charleston, South Carolina, but licensed by the FCC to the town of Hollywood, South Carolina. The station broadcasts with an ERP of 70 kW.  Under ownership of the Charleston Radio Group of Saga Communications, the station's studios are located in Charleston (east of the Cooper River) and the transmitter tower is in Mount Pleasant.

History
99.7 signed on the air July 15, 1988, as WHTK. The station at the time was licensed to Port Royal, with studios located near the town of Bluffton under the ownership of Barnicle Broadcasting. WHTK featured a CHR format targeting nearby Hilton Head and Savannah. Although ratings were very good in its home market of Hilton Head/Beaufort, SC, the station faced stiff competition from competitor WZAT in the Savannah market as well as a weak signal in that area. WHTK played a major role during Hurricane Hugo in 1989 as it was one of the few radio stations that was able to stay on the air for most of the storm and broadcast information to the Lowcountry.

In January 1993, the station dropped its CHR format for Country under the new call letters of WNCK as "K99.7". This lasted less than a year before the station changed formats again to Adult Standards as WLOW moved down the dial from 106.9 to 99.7.

WLOW eventually moved to 107.9 within a year's time and 99.7 once again became WNCK with a Talk format. It eventually gave way to a Contemporary Christian format before going dark in May, 1995.

By the Summer of 1995, the station was sold to Baker Broadcasting, who changed the format to a syndicated Beach Music format under the WHBZ call letters as "The Breeze", pairing it with WWBZ in McClellanville, South Carolina and adding WLXC in Columbia, South Carolina in early 1996.

By 2001, Baker Broadcasting sold WHBZ to Apex Broadcasting, which dropped the simulcast with WWBZ and flipped the station to a simulcast with WSIS. Then it briefly had an All-Comedy format, then a brief satellite-fed Classic rock format with local shows on the weekend. The station became Smooth Jazz under the WJZX call letters.

During this time, the station made a long-planned move into the Charleston radio market by changing its city of license to Hollywood and moving its tower to Mount Pleasant, which was completed in 2003.

When the move was completed, the station flipped again to Adult Urban Contemporary as WXST, adopting the "Star 99.7" handle.

On September 6, 2017, the sale of the station to Saga Communications was complete.

Call letter history
Prior to this, the WXST call letters were first assigned to a station licensed to Loudon, Tennessee, beginning May 24, 1991. It remained until they were dropped on March 16, 1998 for WESK.) Then, WXST was assigned to STAR 107.9 in Delaware, Ohio beginning June 26, 1998. They remained until they were dropped on April 23, 2001 for WJHT, only to be reacquired on May 16, 2001. WXST/Delaware was dropped completely for WODB July 27, 2001 (now WVMX).

References

External links
Star 99.7's official website

Urban adult contemporary radio stations in the United States
XST
Radio stations established in 1989
1989 establishments in South Carolina